Boney may refer to:

People
Boney James (born 1961), American jazz saxophonist
Brad Boney, American author of gay and lesbian fiction
George Frank Boney (1930-1972), Alaska Supreme Court justice
Hank Boney (1903–2002), Major League Baseball pitcher

Other uses
"Boney", a British nickname for Napoleon Bonaparte
"Boney", the title of a sea shanty depicting Napoleon's life and exploits
Boney (TV series), 1971 Australian television series
Boney M., 1970s German pop and disco group
Boney Peak, Santa Monica Mountains, Ventura County, California, U.S.
"Boney", dinosaur character from the television series Weinerville
"Boney", dog and playable character in the video game Mother 3
boney, waste material from coal mining

See also
Bonney (disambiguation)
Bony (disambiguation)